Benthofascis pseudobiconica is a species of sea snail, a marine gastropod mollusc in the family Conorbidae.

These snails are predatory and venomous. They are capable of "stinging" humans, therefore live ones should be handled carefully or not at all.

Description
The length of an adult shell varies between 12.8 mm and 42.4 mm, its diameter between 5.7 mm and 14.9 mm.

Distribution
This marine species is endemic to Australia and occurs off Northern Queensland.

References

External links
 

pseudobiconica
Gastropods of Australia
Gastropods described in 2011